Chernigovka is the name of several rural localities in Russia:
Chernigovka, Arkharinsky District, Amur Oblast, a selo in Chernigovsky Rural Settlement of Arkharinsky District of Amur Oblast
Chernigovka, Svobodnensky District, Amur Oblast, a selo in Zheltoyarovsky Rural Settlement of Svobodnensky District of Amur Oblast
Chernigovka, Chishminsky District, Republic of Bashkortostan, a selo in Arovsky Selsoviet of Chishminsky District of the Republic of Bashkortostan
Chernigovka, Davlekanovsky District, Republic of Bashkortostan, a village in Polyakovsky Selsoviet of Davlekanovsky District of the Republic of Bashkortostan
Chernigovka, Ilansky District, Krasnoyarsk Krai, a village in Dalaysky Selsoviet of Ilansky District of Krasnoyarsk Krai
Chernigovka, Karatuzsky District, Krasnoyarsk Krai, a village in Amylsky Selsoviet of Karatuzsky District of Krasnoyarsk Krai
Chernigovka, Lipetsk Oblast, a selo in Rogozhinsky Selsoviet of Zadonsky District of Lipetsk Oblast
Chernigovka, Chanovsky District, Novosibirsk Oblast, a village in Chanovsky District, Novosibirsk Oblast
Chernigovka, Ust-Tarksky District, Novosibirsk Oblast, a village in Ust-Tarksky District, Novosibirsk Oblast
Chernigovka, Kormilovsky District, Omsk Oblast, a selo in Chernigovsky Rural Okrug of Kormilovsky District of Omsk Oblast
Chernigovka, Tavrichesky District, Omsk Oblast, a village in Leninsky Rural Okrug of Tavrichesky District of Omsk Oblast
Chernigovka, Penza Oblast, a village in Zasechny Selsoviet of Mokshansky District of Penza Oblast
Chernigovka, Primorsky Krai, a selo in Chernigovsky District of Primorsky Krai
Chernigovka, Rostov Oblast, a khutor in Pervomayskoye Rural Settlement of Kasharsky District of Rostov Oblast
Chernigovka, Vladimir Oblast, a village in Sudogodsky District of Vladimir Oblast
Chernigovka (air base), a airbase in Primorsky Krai, Russia
Chernihiv Air Base, a airbase in Ukraine